Jules is an unincorporated community in Cass County, Illinois, United States. Jules is located on Illinois Route 125, northwest of Virginia.

References

Unincorporated communities in Cass County, Illinois
Unincorporated communities in Illinois